Gary Frederick Holton (22 September 1953 – 25 October 1985) was a British singer-songwriter, musician and actor from London. He was the frontman of the band Heavy Metal Kids (1972–1977), worked with Casino Steel (1981–1984), and played the part of Wayne (a.k.a. London) in the UK television comedy Auf Wiedersehen, Pet (1983–1985). Holton died from an overdose of morphine combined with alcohol in 1985.

Early life 
Gary Holton was born in Clapham, south London, the first child of Ernie and Joan Holton, and grew up in Kennington. Whilst musically talented, and a member of a rock band as a schoolboy at Beaufoy School, Lambeth, his real ambition was to act.

Early on in his life, Holton began working in the theatre world with the Sadler's Wells Opera Company, debuting in opera appearances aged eleven, and was with them for three years. In 1966 he had a part in Congreve's Love For Love with Laurence Olivier, and at fourteen played the title role in Menotti's Amahl and the Night Visitors. Soon after leaving education at Westminster School, he joined the Old Vic Theatre Company, and from there he went on to work with the Royal Shakespeare Company at Stratford.

At seventeen, he joined the touring company of Hair, and remained with them for two years. When he left the company, his musical talents led him to front the rock band Heavy Metal Kids as vocalist.

Acting career

Early roles 
Holton made his screen acting debut in 1979, when he played the character of Eddie Hairstyle in the television movie The Knowledge with Michael Elphick and Kim Taylforth. Holton did not receive much credit for this role, nor for his role as an uncredited character in the film Quadrophenia, released the same year. However, after appearing in the television series Shoestring, Holton played the lead part of Ken in the 1979 film Bloody Kids.

In 1980, he played the character of Keith in an episode of television series Play for Today, and as a minor character in the film Breaking Glass. He appeared as a  minor character in the 1981 television film Tiny Revolutions, and guest-starred as Rick Sloan in the television series The Gentle Touch.

Holton also sang the theme tune to 1980s British children's drama, Murphy's Mob, which was produced by Central Television.

Auf Wiedersehen, Pet 

Playing the part of Wayne Winston Norris in the popular comedy drama Auf Wiedersehen, Pet, Holton played a Cockney carpenter, nicknamed "London" by Oz. The character Norris liked his women, music and drink, which was similar to his off-screen personality.

He landed the part, the first of the seven main characters to be cast, after he was introduced to Ian La Frenais at a party. La Frenais and his writing partner Dick Clement had been drafting storylines and working on an idea given to them by Franc Roddam, who was the director of Quadrophenia.

The first series of Auf Wiedersehen, Pet ran between 1983 and 1984. In February 1985, filming began on the second series. The final episode of the second series, broadcast after Holton's death, was dedicated to his memory.

The show was revived in 2002 with the original writers and all of the surviving cast members. The gap in the line-up left by Holton was filled by Wyman, Wayne's illegitimate son, played by Noel Clarke.

Other roles 
While acting on Auf Wiedersehen, Pet, Holton had only two other roles. He appeared in the TV series Minder, in which he played villain Barry, in 1984. He also briefly appeared in the first episode of the television series Bulman the following year. He also appeared in an episode of Shoestring filmed in Bristol.

Holton was offered the role of villain 'Nasty' Nick Cotton in the television soap opera EastEnders, but he turned down the role and it was instead given to Holton's friend John Altman, who bore a strong resemblance to him, and would go on to succeed him as the lead singer of the Heavy Metal Kids.

Musical career

Solo 
His musical endeavours were confined to strict one-offs for a while: in December 1978, Holton stood in for The Damned vocalist Dave Vanian on a short Scottish tour; and he also recorded a solo single (which became a number one hit in Norway), a punk-country version of Kenny Rogers's "Ruby, Don't Take Your Love to Town" with the Boys' keyboardist Casino Steel, with whom he would later write a song simply titled "Auf Wiedersehen Pet" about his experiences in the show. Holton and Steel recorded three albums together, all of them doing well in Norway. But even the opportunity to replace the late Bon Scott in AC/DC could not lure him back to full-time rock & roll. He made an appearance on the TV programme The Tube in 1984 with a band named as The Actors, which included fellow Quadrophenia star Gary Shail on bass guitar, and they performed a song entitled "Long-Legged Blue-Eyed Blonde". In 1985 he was also briefly in a band he formed with Glen Matlock and James Stevenson called The Gang Show.

Heavy Metal Kids

Gary was the front-man for the band, which formed in 1972. With his cockney accent, he became a popular glam rock singer. The band were discovered by former Dave Dee, Dozy, Beaky, Mick & Tich front-man Dave Dee, who signed them to Atlantic Records. Their eponymous debut album was well received by the press, but had achieved limited sales. They later played many gigs with punk rock band The Adverts. On their first American tour in 1975, they shortened their name to "The Kids".

In December 1975, the group signed with producer Mickie Most's RAK label but before work could begin on their next album, Holton was sacked amid a storm of drink- and drug-related headlines. Plans for the remaining members to continue on without him came to nothing. In late 1977, Holton rejoined the band for a handful of live shows and the long-delayed third album, Kitsch. However, by mid-1978, he had departed once again and the band broke up.

Whilst the band was popular in Sweden, they had little commercial success in Britain although in 1976 their single "She's No Angel" was regularly played on BBC Radio 1, a favourite of DJ John Peel, and this led to an appearance on Top of the Pops. The lack of commercial success led to the break-up of the band and Holton returned to acting.

Holton/Steel
In 1980/81, Holton hooked up with Casino Steel, a musician from Norway and in the following years released a couple of (in Norway) bestselling albums. The duo's musical style was country rock with strong punk influences, their first hit being a cover of Kenny Rogers' "Ruby". Gary Holton's Norwegian musical career went largely unnoticed in his homeland.

Personal life

Relationships 
Holton had a string of relationships in the early to mid 1970s. In 1977, he dated singer Stella Palmer, with whom he performed his cover version of "Somethin' Stupid" in 1973. Holton and Palmer got engaged on 12 March 1977, but on 2 May the same year, Palmer called off the engagement, stating their relationship was not going quite as planned.

From 1979 he was married to model Donna Campbell. They were amicably separated from 1981 and remained friends, though they were still not divorced at the time of his death.

After Donna, Holton had a relationship with model Susan Harrison who gave birth to his son Red, in 1983.

At the time of his death, Holton had long separated from Harrison and was engaged to hairdresser Jahnet Mclllewan.

Death 
Holton was found dead by his fiancée Jahner McIllwain in his bed on 25 October 1985. He had died from an overdose of alcohol and morphine, with traces of diazepam and cannabis in his system. Pathologist Rufus Crompton said during his inquest at Hornsey, North London, that he would have been drinking less than half an hour before his death, and that the morphine would have made him unconscious within a matter of minutes.

Holton had a blood alcohol level of 199 mg and a morphine level of 0.8 mg per litre (0.5 mg per litre is considered invariably fatal). He had been a drug user for several years after experiences through the music scene and was addicted to heroin, a habit he had quit some time after the first series of Auf Wiedersehen, Pet had been broadcast. He was considering setting up a clinic to help others with their addictions.

Holton had considerable debts and had two bankruptcy orders totalling £61,000 over him. These debts were partly due to his not having paid tax since 1979, and also having a mortgage of £48,500 on his flat in Maida Vale, London.

He died midway through the second series of Auf Wiedersehen, Pet, but the producers used body doubles and editing of dialogue already recorded to allow the series to be completed. They eventually rescripted the series, such that in every indoor scene that originally included Holton, excuses were made for his absence.

Just before his death, he had released the single "Catch A Falling Star". He had been due to star in the pantomime Peter Pan that upcoming Christmas. He was survived by his son, Red, with model Susan Harrison.

Funeral 
Holton's funeral took place on 22 November 1985, with a 15-minute service at Golders Green Crematorium in London. His Auf Wiedersehen, Pet co-stars attended. His ashes were placed on his grandparents' grave in Maesgwastad Cemetery, Welshpool.

Discography

Albums 
With Heavy Metal Kids

 Heavy Metal Kids (1974) Atlantic Records
 Anvil Chorus (1975) Atlantic Records
 Kitsch (1977) Rak Records

With Casino Steel
 Gary Holton & Casino Steel (1981) Killroy Records
 Part II (1982) Polydor Records
 III Edition (1983) Polydor Records
 No 4 (1984) Polydor Records

Solo
 Sing It To Me (1989) Receiver Records Limited (Released Posthumously; Featuring Mick Rossi)

Singles 
With Heavy Metal Kids
 "It's The Same" (1974) Atlantic Records
 "Ain't Nothing But A House Party/You Got Me Rollin'" (1975) Atlantic Records
 "Ain't Nothing But A House Party/You Got Me Rollin' Re-Mix" (1975) Atlantic Records
 "She's No Angel" (1976) Rak Records
 "Delirious" (1977) Rak Records/EMI Electrola
 "Chelsea Kids" (1977) Rak Records/EMI Electrola

With Casino Steel
 "Ruby, Don't Take Your Love to Town" (1981) X Records
 "Blackberry Way"/"Candy" (1982) Polydor Records
 "No Reply" (1983) Polydor Records
 "Runaway" (1989) Amulet Records (Released Posthumously)

Solo
 "Ruby, Don't Take Your Love to Town" (1980) Safari Records
 "Catch A Falling Star" (1984) Magnet Records
 "Holiday Romance" (1984) Magnet Records (Featuring Mick Rossi)
 "People in Love" (1986) Gaza Records (Released Posthumously; Featuring Mick Rossi)
 "Catch A Falling Star Re-Issue" (1989) Not on Label (Released Posthumously)

Filmography

References

External links
 http://www.garyholtontribute.co.uk/
 

1952 births
1985 deaths
Alcohol-related deaths in England
Drug-related deaths in England
English rock musicians
English rock singers
English male singers
English rock guitarists
English rock keyboardists
English male television actors
Royal Shakespeare Company members
People educated at Westminster School, London
Male actors from London
People from Clapham
20th-century English male actors
20th-century English singers
English male guitarists
20th-century British guitarists
20th-century British male singers